(Madmen by Design) is a farsa in one act by Gaetano Donizetti to a libretto by Domenico Gilardoni. The first performance took place at the Teatro di San Carlo on 6 February 1830 and was followed by its second presentation on 7 February at the Teatro del Fondo.

At the 1830 performance in Naples, some great singers of the time such as Boccabadati and Luigi Lablache performed it in a charity event, but despite the exceptional cast, the audience was really very meager. The work, carried by two women surrounded by five heavy voices, was divided into seven numbers linked by dry ("secco") or accompanied recitatives. It revealed the purest farcical style of the composer, containing the characters and forms typical of that style.

It was performed a few more times in Naples and Palermo up until 1845, and then forgotten until 1977.

Performance history
In 1977 a new revision, edited by Maestro Bruno Rigacci of Florence and using the original score  which had been preserved at the Conservatorio S. Pietro a Majella in Naples, was presented as part of the Opera Barga Festival. It was a resounding success with the public and the critics.

Roles
 Darlemont, directore of a mental hospital, uncle of Norina - bass
 Norina, wife of Blinval - soprano
 Blinval, colonel - bass-baritone
 Cristina, a young girl, in love with Blinval - mezzo-soprano
 Venanzio, stingy old man, guardian of Cristina - bass
 Eustachio, trumpeter of Blinval's regiment - baritone
 Frank, servant of Darlemont - bass-baritone

Synopsis
Place: A hospital for the insane in Paris
Time: Early 19th Century

The hospital's director, Darlemont, has a niece, Norina, married to Blinval, a colonel of dragoons. The remoteness of the man from his beloved wife due to military reasons and mutual jealousy are the causes of series of actions when the two meet again. Since the meeting takes place in the hospital which is managed by Norina's uncle, the two alternately pose themselves as crazy to find out the true feelings of each other, causing frantic carousel of deceptions and misunderstandings.

Added to all this is a very babbler and an all-too-sincere servant, (Frank), a deserter trumpeter who pretends to be a doctor (Eustace), a beautiful young girl (Christina), former lover of the colonel, who tries to escape from her old guardian (Venanzio).  He in turn tries to make her go mad so that he can take her dowry.

These very well-matched ingredients result in a farce with all its rules. At the well-designed end, peace and moral obligation are restored.

Recordings

References

Notes

Sources
Allitt, John Stewart (1991), Donizetti: in the light of Romanticism and the teaching of Johann Simon Mayr, Shaftesbury: Element Books, Ltd (UK); Rockport, MA: Element, Inc.(USA)
Ashbrook, William (1982), Donizetti and His Operas, Cambridge University Press.  
Ashbrook, William (1998), "Donizetti, Gaetano" in Stanley Sadie  (Ed.),  The New Grove Dictionary of Opera, Vol. One. London: Macmillan Publishers, Inc.   
Ashbrook, William and Sarah Hibberd (2001), in  Holden, Amanda (Ed.), The New Penguin Opera Guide, New York: Penguin Putnam. .  pp. 224 – 247.
Black, John (1982), Donizetti’s Operas in Naples, 1822—1848. London: The Donizetti Society.
Loewenberg, Alfred (1970). Annals of Opera, 1597-1940, 2nd edition.  Rowman and Littlefield
Osborne, Charles, (1994),  The Bel Canto Operas of Rossini, Donizetti, and Bellini,  Portland, Oregon: Amadeus Press. 
Sadie, Stanley, (Ed.); John Tyrell (Exec. Ed.) (2004), The New Grove Dictionary of Music and Musicians.  2nd edition. London: Macmillan.    (hardcover).   (eBook).
 Weinstock, Herbert (1963), Donizetti and the World of Opera in Italy, Paris, and Vienna in the First Half of the Nineteenth Century, New York: Pantheon Books.

External links
 Donizetti Society (London) website

1830 operas
Operas by Gaetano Donizetti
One-act operas
Operas set in Paris
Operas